Daingerfield High School is 3A public high school located in Daingerfield, Texas, United States. It is part of the Daingerfield-Lone Star Independent School District located in central Morris County.  In 2011, the school was rated "Academically Acceptable" by the Texas Education Agency.

Athletics
The Daingerfield Tigers compete in the following sports:

Baseball
Basketball
Cross Country
Football
Golf
Powerlifting
Softball
Tennis
Track and Field
Volleyball

Football
The 1983 team holds the NFHS national record for most shutouts in a single season and considered the most dominant in Texas history.  The team scored 631 points while allowing only 8 the entire season, zero on defense (the only points scored by an opposing team were a touchdown on an interception return to Carthage and a safety to Kilgore, both substantially larger schools than Daingerfield).  Of the 16 games won (the first Texas high school to win 16 games in a season), 14 were shutouts (which ranks as the #1 national 11 man football single season record, as recorded on NFHS.org) including the final 13 (the final seven of the regular season and all six playoff games, the only team in Texas high school football history to accomplish the latter feat).  The 50th Anniversary Edition of Dave Campbell's Texas Football nominated the 1983 team as the #2 most memorable team (pro, college, or high school) in Texas football history; only the 1969 Texas Longhorn national championship team was rated higher.

State Titles

Daingerfield (UIL)

Boys Basketball -
1977(3A)
Football -
1968(2A), 1983(3A), 1985(3A), 2008(2A/D1), 2009(2A/D1), 2010(2A/D1)
Boys Golf -
1969(2A)
Boys Track -
1963(2A), 1984(3A), 1995(3A), 2010(2A)
Girls Track -
1990(3A)

Daingerfield Rhoads (PVIL)

Boys Basketball -
1964(PVIL-2A)

State Finalists

Daingerfield (UIL)

Football –
1984(3A), 1998(3A/D2), 2012 (2A/D1)

Daingerfield Rhoads (PVIL)

Boys Basketball -
1955(PVIL-1A), 1956(PVIL-1A), 1961(PVIL-2A)

Notable alumni
 Darryl Lewis – American football player
 Greg Evans - American football player
Thomas Everett Pittsburgh Steelers, Dallas Cowboys (Super Bowl Champions)
Eric Everett Philadelphia Eagles
David Whitmore NY Giants, Washington Redskins
Denzel Mims - American football player for the New York Jets

References

http://www.nfhs.org/recordbook/Records.aspx?CategoryId=1 National Federation of State High Schools Association Recordbook See Most Shutouts in a Single Season

External links
Daingerfield ISD
 See Most Shutouts in a single season

Public high schools in Texas
Education in Morris County, Texas